Blanca de Silos (2 August 1914 – 13 September 2002) was a Spanish film actress. She appeared in fifteen films, including playing the title role in Mariona Rebull (1947).

Selected filmography
 Raza (1942)
 Intrigue (1942)
 House of Cards (1943)
 The House of Rain (1943)
 Orosia (1944)
 Mariona Rebull (1947)
 Monsieur Robinson Crusoe (1960)

References

Bibliography 
 Helio San Miguel, Lorenzo J. Torres Hortelano. World Film Locations: Barcelona. Intellect Books, 2013.

External links 
 

1914 births
2002 deaths
Spanish film actresses